The November 2020 North American storm complex was a major early-season snowstorm that impacted most of the Ohio Valley from November 30–December 2 with heavy snow, gusty winds, and near-whiteout conditions. The system originated from a weak gulf low off the coast of Texas on November 29, which began to move northeastward onto land the next day. It then began to strengthen, as well as slowing its movement down, resulting in heavy, wind-driven snow for prolonged periods of time in the Ohio Valley. It also triggered a major lake-effect snow event from December 1–2 as the system stalled over Lake Ontario, resulting in additional heavy snowfall. The storm system was also responsible for a severe thunderstorm outbreak in the Southeast and Mid-Atlantic regions, causing 22 severe thunderstorms and 5 tornadoes. In total, the system is estimated to have caused at least $100 million (2020 USD) in damages. It was unofficially named Winter Storm Dane by The Weather Channel.

Meteorological history
The system formed as a weak low-pressure system off the coast of southeastern Texas early on November 29. After meandering eastward for around 12 hours, the low-pressure made landfall and came ashore in southeastern Louisiana at 18:00 UTC. It then turned northeastward, beginning to strengthen and spawning a secondary low-pressure to the east. Another low-pressure dissipated a few hours later, leaving only the main low remaining, which began to slowly weaken. The system continued weakening throughout December 1, and by early on December 2, it had begun moving to the northeast again. After continuing to weaken for several hours, it dissipated late on December 2.

Preparations and impact

Winter Storm Warnings were issued in parts of Ohio and Pennsylvania, mainly along the shores of Lake Erie due to the potential for heavy snow. Winter Weather Advisories were issued in a broad swath farther south, stretching all the way down to eastern Tennessee.

Ohio Valley
Snow fell in Cleveland all day November 30, and the city saw  of snow during the event. Trees and power lines were downed in the Cleveland area due to the heavy snow and strong winds. Detroit, Pittsburgh, Columbus, and other areas further away from Lake Erie generally saw  of snow from the system.

Southern Appalachians
In Arab, Alabama,  of snow was measured. Around  of snow was reported in the Murfreesboro, Tennessee area. By the end of the night, Mount Le Conte, Tennessee had seen  inches of snow, as reported by the National Weather Service.

Severe weather

The warm side of the system also resulted in some severe thunderstorms in the Southeast and Mid-Atlantic regions. Several of the storms became tornadic, with at least five tornadoes being confirmed on November 30. The storms also resulted in 22 reports of wind damage in an area from Maryland to eastern Pennsylvania.

Confirmed tornadoes

See also

 April 2016 North American storm complex
 Tornado outbreak and floods of April 28 – May 1, 2017
 Tornado outbreak and blizzard of April 13–15, 2018

Notes

References

External links
 2020 Storm Summaries from the Weather Prediction Center

2020 in North America
2020–21 North American winter
F0 and F1 tornadoes
Tornadoes in Maryland
2020 meteorology
Tornadoes of 2020
Tornadoes in Florida
Tornadoes in Pennsylvania